Richard "Rick" DeVecchi (1961– December 17, 1998) was an American worker for a Berkeley, California trucking business. He and his family were originally from San Lorenzo, which is in the San Francisco Bay Area.

Murder
Rick DeVecchi and his family had just gotten to the Berkeley Warehouse on the morning of Thursday, December 17, 1998. Just after 7:10 am that morning, a fellow employee at the business witnessed a stranger going through the back of Rick's pickup truck. Just before 7:15 am, Richard and the fellow employee went out to investigate the situation. By that time, however, the stranger had already gotten into his automobile, a 1970s or early 1980s tan or white colored Cadillac.

According to the Berkeley police and to four witnesses, that Thursday morning, the stranger was driving slowly at first. However, he began accelerating and driving faster, at which point he then hit Richard DeVecchi. The suspect continued driving after he hit Rick.

Rick's father Dick got on the telephone and dialed 9-1-1 just after witnessing the incident.

Richard was taken to a nearby hospital just after the crime. Three days after the incident, Richard succumbed to his injuries; the incident was then considered a murder by the Berkeley police.

The suspect in the homicide was later described by local police as an African American male.

According to the Berkeley police and several witnesses that had seen the hit and run that morning, the license plates on the Cadillac had the letters "CUS".

Later years
The killing of Rick DeVecchi was later shown on the television show America's Most Wanted; it was profiled several times on the show in the years following the incident. The murder suspect has not been arrested as of 2020.

See also
List of unsolved murders

References

1998 in California
1998 murders in the United States
December 1998 events in the United States
December 1998 crimes
20th century in Berkeley, California
Male murder victims
People murdered in California
Unsolved murders in the United States
Murders by motor vehicle
Road incident deaths in California